Vammalan Lentopallo — Valepa is a volleyball team in southwest Finland founded in 1978. It is based in the Vammala district of the town of Sastamala, in the Pirkanmaa Region. Valepa plays in the highest level in Finland.

History 
Vammalan Lentopallo was founded 1978, with the club's first season in SM-liiga in 1980-1981.

VaLePa is known to be a good place for young players. Many of the club's own juniors have reached professional level and other young talents have made their pro-level debut in the club. Some of the best known of them are Olli-Pekka Ojansivu, Olli Kunnari, Mikko Oivanen and Matti Oivanen.

The team's best result to date is the national champion title, which it won twice (in the 2011-2012 and 2013-2014 seasons. In 2012, it also won the Finnish Cup.

European competitions
Valepa played in the CEV Challenge Cup in the 2008-2009 season, where it lost both the home match (1-3) and the return match in Burgas (3-0) to the Bulgarian Neftehimik team.
In 2012-2013 VaLePa played in the CEV Cup. The first round was against the Estonian team of Selver Tallinn. VaLePa won through golden set after both teams had won a match (Selver - VaLePa 3-2, VaLePa - Selver 3-0). In the second round, VaLePa faced the Italian Andreoli Latina, which was stronger in the golden set (VaLePa - Latina 3-1, Latina - VaLePa 3-0).

New Arena
Season 2012-2013 was a big change for the club. Old small homeground Sylvää was abandoned for new bigger VexVe Arena. The team sometimes still train in Sylvää and second team also plays there some of their games.

Achievements 
 Finland league bronze 1992, 2008,2013 and 2014
 Finland league silver 2011
 Finland league champion 2012 and 2014
 Finnish Cup winner 2012
 Finnish Cup runners-up 2013 and 2014

Team

Season 2018-2019 

Setters
 Mikko Esko
 Arttu Lehtimäki

Middle-blockers
 Daniel Jansen Van Doorn (CAN) 
 Markus Kaurto
 Tommi Siirilä
 Mikko Karjarinta
 Rami Rekomaa
 
Wing-spikers
 Olli Kunnari 
 Erik Sundberg
 Niko Suihkonen

Opposite
 Arvis Greene (USA)
 Urpo Sivula
 Aaro Nikula

Libero
 Alan Barbosa Domingos

Head coach 
 Radovan Gacic

Assistant coach
 Janne Kangaskokko

Club chairman
 Arto Satonen — also a member of the Parliament of Finland.

References

Finnish volleyball clubs
Sastamala